Vrana may refer to:
 Vrana (town), a village in Zadar County, Dalmatia, Croatia
 Vrána, Czech surname
 Vrana Palace, a former royal palace, located on the outskirts of Sofia, the capital of Bulgaria
 Lake Vrana (Cres), a lake on the island of Cres, Croatia
 Lake Vrana (Dalmatia), a lake near the eponymous village in Dalmatia, Croatia
 Vranje, a town in Serbia, also formerly known as Vrana

See also